The Canal through Zuid-Beveland (Dutch: Kanaal door Zuid-Beveland) in the southwest Netherlands is the westernmost of two canals crossing the Zuid-Beveland peninsula. It connects the Western Scheldt near Hansweert (to the south of the canal) via sluices and the Eastern Scheldt (to the north) has an open connection.

External  links 
   Canal through Zuid-Beveland - Ministry of Infrastructure and Water Management

References

Canals in the Rhine–Meuse–Scheldt delta
Canals opened in 1866
1866 establishments in the Netherlands
Canals in Zeeland
Transport in Reimerswaal
Kapelle
Zuid-Beveland
19th-century architecture in the Netherlands